The 1958 NCAA University Division baseball tournament was played at the end of the 1958 NCAA University Division baseball season to determine the national champion of college baseball.  The tournament concluded with eight teams competing in the College World Series, a double-elimination tournament in its twelfth year.  Eight regional districts sent representatives to the College World Series with preliminary rounds within each district serving to determine each representative.  These events would later become known as regionals.  Each district had its own format for selecting teams, resulting in 26 teams participating in the tournament at the conclusion of their regular season, and in some cases, after a conference tournament.  The College World Series was held in Omaha, NE from June 13 to June 19.  The twelfth tournament's champion was Southern California, coached by Rod Dedeaux.  The Most Outstanding Player was Bill Thom of Southern California.

Tournament

District 1

District 2

District 3

District 4

District 5

District 6

District 7

Brigham Young University withdrew from district.  Colorado State was selected as District 7 representative in the College World Series.

District 8

College World Series

Participants

Brackets

Game results

All-Tournament Team
The following players were members of the All-Tournament Team.

Notable players
 Missouri: Hank Kuhlmann, Sonny Siebert
 Southern California: Don Buford, Ron Fairly, Pat Gillick, Fred Scott, Bill Thom

Quick facts
 In 1996, Rod Dedeaux of USC was named to the College World Series All-Time Team (1947–95) by the Oklahoma World-Herald as part of the 50th CWS celebration; 1958 marked the first of his 10 titles as sole head coach, after having won the 1948 CWS as co-coach with Sam Barry.
 In 1971, Ron Fairly (OF) of USC was named to the College World Series All-Time Team (1947–70) by the blue-ribbon committee chaired by Abe Chanin as part of the 25th CWS celebration.
 In 1996, Alan Hall (C) of Arizona and Ken Komodzinski (3B) of Holy Cross were named to the 1940s-50s All-Decade Team by a panel of 60 voters representing CWS head coaches, media, and chairs of the Division I Baseball Committee.
 USC's Robert Blakeslee pitched a two-hitter against Northern Colorado.
 25,931 fans watched the CWS (10 sessions).
 The championship game was umpired by Bob Stewart, Vinnie Smith, Jerry Carlton, and George Hametz.
 The following records were tied:
 Most Sacrifice Bunts, Individual, Single Game - 3, Paul Chamberlain, vs Lafayette, W 10-5, tied
 Most Triples, Individual, CWS - 3, Sonny Siebert, Missouri, 6 games, tied (2 others)
 Most Errors, Individual, Championship Game - 3, Gary Starr, Missouri, vs USC, L 8-7 (12), tied (2 others)
 Most Runs, One Inning, Team, Championship Game - 7, USC, vs Missouri, 4th inning, W 8-7 (12), tied
 Most Errors, Team, Championship Game - 6, Missouri, vs USC, L 8-7 (12), tied
 Most Errors, Both Teams, Championship Game - 8, Missouri (6) vs USC (2), USC 8-7 (12), tied (2 others)
 Largest Margin Overcome for Victory, Championship Game - 4, USC, vs Missouri, W 8-7 (12), tied

Notes

See also
 1958 NCAA College Division baseball tournament
 1958 NAIA World Series

References

 

NCAA Division I Baseball Championship
Tournament